Great Mell Fell (Bare hill, with the later additions of both "Fell" and "Great") is an isolated hill or fell in the English Lake District, north of Ullswater and adjacent to the Eastern Fells. It rises from a level plain to a height of 537 m. Its top is an excellent viewpoint for many of the surrounding higher fells. The fell is now owned and managed by the National Trust and offers a place of quiet refuge.

The fell was once well wooded, and retains a good covering of trees on the lower slopes, as well as scattered larches and pines higher up. Its rock is unusual for the Lake District, a reddish conglomerate of Devonian age, which has been eroded to form a rounded hill with smooth outlines and no rocky crags.

Topography
Great Mell Fell is an isolated hill which rises abruptly from a wide expanse of marshy lowland to a height of 537 m. The fell has smooth, rounded outlines with no crags. Rock is represented only by a number of large erratic boulders, mainly on the north slopes, but also by the Cloven Stone near a barn to the south of the fell.

The hill is triangular in plan (indeed, it is almost the shape of a broad arrow-head) with the apex pointing west, down the steep "nose" of the fell, and with the gentler, broader eastern slopes divided by two shallow valleys which drain into the Wham Sike and Routing Gill Beck.

Great Mell Fell lies on the watershed between the Derwent river system to the west and the Eden system to the east. This watershed is formed by a low ridge, barely perceptible in places, which connects the Northern and Eastern Fells. From Bowscale Fell it runs across Eycott Hill to Great Mell Fell, then over Cockley Moor to High Brow and up the north-east ridge of Great Dodd, to join the main ridge on the Helvellyn range. Thus the eastern sides of the fell drain eventually into the River Eden via Dacre Beck and the River Eamont, while the western parts drain through Keswick via Trout Beck, the River Glenderamackin and the River Greta to the Derwent.

Flora and fauna
Great Mell Fell is a quiet place of refuge within the surrounding agricultural land, for wildlife as well as for walkers. The sheltered lower eastern slopes are well covered by mixed woods of oak, rowan, birch, holly and Scots pine. Within the trees badgers and roe deer live, and green woodpeckers nest. It is said that the last wild cat in Cumberland was snared here in the nineteenth century.

Higher up the fell an old planting of Scots pine straddles the eastern ridge, and contorted wind-blown larches grow higher still, some blown almost horizontal. The trees give a glimpse of what other fells may have looked like in better-wooded times. A nineteenth-century guidebook claims that larch was planted all over the fell. However the fell’s name suggests that it was treeless in first millennium Celtic-speaking times.

Clumps of tough grass and occasional clumps of heather cover the highest parts, where occasional red grouse may nest.

Summit
The summit is crowned by a low mound, marked as a tumulus on the Ordnance Survey 1:25,000 Explorer map. This is probably a small Bronze Age burial mound. A small cairn has been built on top of it, but was not there in the 1950s, when a dead tree trunk marked the spot.

The isolated position of the fell makes it a splendid viewpoint. Blencathra and the Dodds dominate the view towards the west, while to the south is an impressive vista of both the Far Eastern and the Eastern Fells, as far as Red Screes and the Kirkstone Pass. To the east, beyond Little Mell Fell there is a clear view across the Eden Valley to the north Pennines.

Ascents
Great Mell Fell is now owned and managed by the National Trust. The whole fell is now open access land.

Access to the fell may be gained from near Brownrigg Farm on the minor road between Matterdale End and the A66 road, or from just south of Troutbeck on the A5091 road, along the disused rifle range. Paths just inside the boundary fence allow a circuit of the fell. The western end of the fell offers a very steep but grassy climb to the top. A gentler ascent follows a used path from the south-eastern corner and along the east ridge.

History
There is a disused rifle range to the north-west of the fell. The target control building may still be seen. This was in use from the late 1890s, then by the War Department (now the Ministry of Defence) during the war years and into the 1950s. As a result, access to the whole fell was prohibited at the time by red danger signs. Alfred Wainwright includes a drawing of one of the signs in his 1955 guide book, but he himself apparently ignored the warnings and explored the fell anyway. Careful examination of the exposed soil in the butts will still reveal dead 303 rounds from the era

Geology

Both Great and Little Mell Fells are unique among the fells of the Lake District by being composed of the Mell Fell Conglomerate, a sedimentary rock formed from deposits of sand and gravel in alluvial fans and braided river channels in a desert environment. The rock contains no fossils. The stones in the conglomerate came from the erosion of both the Borrowdale Volcanic Group and the Windermere Supergroup. The reddish-coloured rock appears to date from the late Devonian Period, sometime around 375 million years ago. The erosion of this conglomerate has formed the smooth and rounded outlines that are distinctive of the two Mell Fells. While there are no crags on Great Mell Fell, boulders of the conglomerate may be seen in places, especially on the north slope, and it may also be seen in the two stream beds.

This Devonian conglomerate rests on the Birker Fell Andesite Formation, a thick sequence of andesite lava flows from the Ordovician Period, about 450 million years ago, and part of the Borrowdale Volcanic Group. This rock may be seen at the foot of the fell in the south-east corner, where a small quarry (at the beginning of the path along the south side of the fell) has extracted a little of this andesite.

Rocks of the Devonian Period are also referred to as the Old Red Sandstone. These should be distinguished from the younger New Red Sandstone of the Permian Period, found nearby in Penrith and the Eden Valley.

Name
Mell Fell is found in the earlier form Melfel (1279) and is probably derived from the Brittonic (Cumbric) word męl (c.f. Welsh moel), a bare hill, with Fell as a later addition.

Fell is a local dialect word with several meanings, from either Old Norse fell, 'hill, mountain', or Old Norse fjall, 'mountainous country'. Fell is very common in Lake District place-names, some of which, like Mell Fell, are ancient, though many others are much more modern.

The two Mell Fells have been distinguished as Great and Little since at least the fifteenth century, but Greenwood's map of 1823 distinguishes them as West and East Mell Fell.

Image gallery

References

Fells of the Lake District
Marilyns of England
Hutton, Cumbria